The women's 800 metres event at the 2011 Summer Universiade was held on 16–18 August.

Medalists

Results

Heats
Qualification: First 3 in each heat (Q) and the next 4 fastest (q) qualified for the semifinals.

Semifinals
Qualification: First 3 in each heat (Q) and the next 2 fastest (q) qualified for the final.

Final

References
Heats results
Semifinals results
Final results

800
2011 in women's athletics